Elena Glebova (born 16 June 1989) is an Estonian former competitive figure skater. She won five senior international medals (three gold, two silver) and seven Estonian national titles. She finished as high as seventh at the European Championships (2014) and 13th at the World Championships (2012).

Skating career 
Glebova started skating when she was five years old after watching her brother practice. She trained in Estonia with coach Irina Kononova from the age of 5 to 12, and then with Anna Levandi for ten years.

Glebova appeared at her first World Junior Championships in 2004 and debuted at the European and World Championships in 2005. In 2006, she competed at the 2006 Winter Olympics in Turin, Italy, finishing 28th. In 2007, she achieved her best World Junior result, sixth in Oberstdorf. In 2010, she placed 21st at the Vancouver Olympics.

In 2011, Glebova moved from Estonia to Hackensack, New Jersey and began training with coaches Igor Krokavec and Craig Maurizi. She placed 13th at the 2012 World Championships in Nice, France. The next season, she finished 16th at the 2013 World Championships in London, Ontario. Her result qualified a spot for Estonia in the ladies' event at the 2014 Olympics.

In the 2013–14 season, Glebova finished seventh at the European Championships in Budapest, the best result of her career. She placed 29th at the 2014 Winter Olympics in Sochi. She retired from competition in May 2014.

Personal life 
Glebova has an elder brother, Ilja Glebov, who also competed in figure skating. As of 2014, she works for Tallinn's city council.

Programs

Competitive highlights

References

External links

 
 Official website

Figure skaters from Tallinn
Olympic figure skaters of Estonia
Figure skaters at the 2006 Winter Olympics
Figure skaters at the 2010 Winter Olympics
Figure skaters at the 2014 Winter Olympics
Estonian female single skaters
1989 births
Living people
Estonian people of Russian descent
Competitors at the 2013 Winter Universiade
Competitors at the 2011 Winter Universiade
Competitors at the 2009 Winter Universiade